Shoot the Sun Down is a 1978 American Neo-Western film made in the style of Sergio Leone.  It is directed by David Leeds, written by Leeds and Richard Rothstein, and stars Christopher Walken, Margot Kidder, Geoffrey Lewis, Bo Brundin, and A Martinez.

Plot 
In the late 1830s, when much of the Old West was still under Mexican governance, four people are traveling through the deserts, north of Texas and a three-day ride from Santa Fe. Along with the difficulties of Americans and Spanish Troops, much of the unmonitored areas are controlled by competing tribes of Native Americans such as the Navajo, Apache and Hopi.

One is the Scalphunter (Geoffrey Lewis), who says his trade is being a "buffaler" (buffalo hide trader). He is in search of gold. The others are a former ship Captain (Bo Brundin), also in search of the gold; the young woman from England (Margot Kidder), a former chambermaid who, in exchange for ship's passage to America, has signed an agreement to serve the Captain for five years as an indentured servant; and Mr. Rainbow (Christopher Walken), a former Confederate soldier who deserted after being ordered to hunt and kill "Indians."

The Captain sets out to find some of Montezuma's gold, risking danger from both the Native Indians and Mexican soldiers. The "Girl" wants to get out of her contract with the Captain and go to New Orleans and with the help of Mr. Rainbow's and his deal with the Captain. The Scalphunter wants half of the Captain's gold, and tags along with his men and a captured tribe of Native Americans who set out across the desert through the Viaje de la Muerte, the Journey of Death. Sensing competition, the Scalphunter and the Captain align and tie Rainbow to the rocks to die in the heat. They back out on the girl's freedom agreement and leave. An elder of the Tribe frees Rainbow and asks him to save his family and people from the Scalphunter. Rainbow agrees and races across the desert to free the tribe family and the Girl from the control of the Scalphunter and Captain. As they roll a massive golden wheel of Montezuma across the deadly desert, the run into a contingent of Spanish soldiers who threaten to confiscate the wheel of gold and a shoot out ensues with disastrous results for both sides.

Cast
 Margot Kidder as The Woman
 Geoffrey Lewis as Scalphunter
 Christopher Walken as Mr. Rainbow
 Bo Brundin as Captain
 A Martinez as Sunbearer
 Sacheen Littlefeather as Navajo Woman

External links 
 
 

1978 films
1978 Western (genre) films
American Western (genre) films
Films set in the 1830s
Films shot in New Mexico
Films shot in El Paso, Texas
1970s English-language films
1970s American films